SNICK (short for Saturday Night Nickelodeon) was a two-hour programming block on the American cable television network Nickelodeon, geared toward older (preteen to teen) audiences, that ran from August 15, 1992 until January 29, 2005. It was aired on Saturdays starting at 8 p.m and ending at 10 p.m. ET. In 2005, SNICK was revamped as the Saturday night edition of TEENick. Nickelodeon continues to run a Saturday night programming block today, though since the TEENick name was removed from the lineup in February 2009, the block no longer goes by any name.

The block debuted on Saturday, August 15, 1992, with a pair of Sunday favorites (the teen sitcom Clarissa Explains It All and The Ren & Stimpy Show) and the network premieres of Roundhouse (a musical comedy variety series) and Are You Afraid of the Dark? (a horror fantasy-drama anthology series).

Background
At the time of SNICK's creation, traditional networks such as ABC, NBC and CBS didn't like to program for younger viewers on Saturday nights. The consensus at the time was that viewers who were 50 years of age and older, were the only ones available, since younger viewers traditionally went out on Saturday nights. This would explain why shows such as NBC's The Golden Girls and Empty Nest were the most predominant shows on Saturday nights at the time. Previously on Saturdays, Nickelodeon themselves ceded the 8 p.m. timeslot to the vintage sitcoms of the channel's late night programming block, Nick at Nite. 

Then-Nickelodeon president Geraldine Laybourne wanted to expose the myth that there is no audience for kids and teen programming on Saturday nights. Laybourne on that end, was a purveyor of market niche-talk, which was a strategy of programming highly focused programs targeted to specific groups defined by age, gender, race, education, religion or any of a number of other factors. In theory, the audience who would most likely watch SNICK would be too young to be out on the town and subsequently too old to be in bed by eight.

Laybourne believed that the original shows on the SNICK block would double Nickelodeon's audience on Saturday night by as many as 650,000 to one million viewers. According to Nickelodeon, about one-third of The Ren & Stimpy Shows audience, more than a million viewers, were between the ages of 18 and 35. By early 1993, Nickelodeon according to A.C. Nielsen ratings, was the number one network among viewers ages 6-11 on Saturday nights. With a 6.4 age-group rating, Nickelodeon beat Fox's 5.5, NBC's 5.2, CBS' 4.8, and ABC's 3.2

History

1999–2001: SNICK House
In 1999, SNICK was revamped and was renamed to SNICK House. With this came a number of changes. The block was now hosted by Nick Cannon, and each week, a celebrity or music group made an appearance. The format was very similar to the former TEENick block, but was more of a party. Each week, kids could go online and vote for their favorite SNICK House Video Picks. The winning music video would then be played during the block.

2001–2002: Elevator Music Era
After the SNICK House was cancelled in August 2001, with the last program aired being The Brothers Garcia, Nick replaced SNICK's normal slot with "Nick Flicks", 90 minute Nicktoon specials followed by The Brothers García. This went on from July 7, 2001 to January 12, 2002 and from June 29, 2002 to September 7, 2002. On January 19, 2002, the brand new SNICK began with a whole new lineup, including a brand new season and subsequently a new cast of All That, which had been on hiatus for a year and a half. Bumpers now featured still pictures of various SNICK stars with a SNICK "talk bubble" above them, with elevator music playing in the background.

2002–2004: SNICK On-Air Dare
Starting in September 2002, SNICK featured a series of On-Air Dare segments featuring members of the All That cast. All but three members of the cast would pull a lever to determine the night's "dare", which one of the three would have to do. The three cast members from All That in each segment would be placed in a glass cylinder and one would be randomly chosen to participate in a dare. If chosen, two security guards enter and grab the cast member (as if he or she was arrested) so they don't escape. This appears to have been based on Fear Factor.

Some of these dares included singing the National Anthem in a diaper, apple bobbing in a toilet, taking a bath in a tub of raw eggs, eating a couple gallons of blue cheese, being painted with peanut butter and licked by dogs, hanging upside down and being dipped in dog food, having buckets of worms dumped on the cast member's head, drinking a gallon of sweat, sitting in a giant bowl of chili, eating 1,000 toe nails, the cast member putting an entire scorpion in their mouth, the cast member being pecked by hungry chickens, or shaving their school principal's legs.

During this era of SNICK, the SNICK line-ups went through some major transitions that included the phasing out of The Nick Cannon Show and Cousin Skeeter and the addition of a new show, Romeo!.

Despite that, design company Beehive created brand new bumpers for SNICK in 2003, featuring an orange splat morphing into a show's character. Instead of saying "SNICK", the announcer said "Saturday Night Nickelodeon".

2004–2005: Saturday Night on Nickelodeon era and the end of SNICK
On September 4, 2004, SNICK was quietly rebranded as Saturday Night on Nickelodeon. However, the SNICK name was still used during live on-air segments. TEENick Saturday Night replaced SNICK for the 2004-2005 television season and onward. The TEENick block name was dropped in February 2009 in preparation for the launch of a separate channel named after the block, TeenNick. TeenNick launched in September 2009 and much of its programming was sourced from the original TEENick block.

2011: SNICK on The '90s Are All That
In 2011, TeenNick would begin airing 1990s era Nickelodeon shows starting at 12:00 AM Eastern Time under the banner The '90s Are All That. All That and Kenan & Kel are the most prominent and consistent SNICK shows to get reruns. It was announced that the week of December 26, 2011 up until New Year's Eve that TeenNick would air classic SNICK lineups from each year of the 1990s, with a special marathon airing New Year's Eve, all with classic SNICK and Nickelodeon bumpers from the 1990s.

On August 17, 2013, SNICK returned to The '90s Are All That, for its "SNICK-iversary", celebrating its 21st anniversary, reaching drinking age if it were a person. The original lineup was aired (Clarissa Explains It All, The Ren & Stimpy Show and Are You Afraid of the Dark?) with the exception of Roundhouse being replaced by All That.

2017: SNICK on NickSplat
Since the block's 2011 resurgence, SNICK has returned to TeenNick three times. The first two under the block timeslot of The '90s Are All That, which was renamed to The Splat on October 5, 2015, and was renamed once again as NickSplat on May 1, 2017. SNICK's third appearance on TeenNick was to celebrate SNICK's 25th anniversary by airing episodes Saturday nights during the month of August 2017.

August 5, 2017:
 12AM The Adventures of Pete and Pete
 12:30AM Clarissa Explains It All
 1AM Are You Afraid of the Dark?
 1:30AM The Ren & Stimpy Show

August 12, 2017:
 12AM All That
 12:30AM All That
 1AM Kenan & Kel
 1:30AM Kenan & Kel

August 15, 2017:
 10PM Clarissa Explains It All
 10:30PM Roundhouse
 11PM The Ren & Stimpy Show
 11:30PM Are You Afraid of the Dark?

August 19, 2017:
 12AM KaBlam!
 12:30AM Rugrats
 1AM CatDog
 1:30AM The Angry Beavers

August 26, 2017:
 12AM The Amanda Show
 12:30AM The Amanda Show
 1AM All That
 1:30AM All That

Ads and bumpers
Ads and bumpers for SNICK featured the programming block's "mascot," dubbed "The Big Orange Couch," in several locales, including in front of the Midnight Society's campfire, Ren and Stimpy's house, the Roundhouse, as well as various real life and fictional locations. It was retired in June 1999 (however the couch was briefly returned from 2000-2001, in which it was redesigned), when the iconic couch, stuffed with $25,000 and 6,000 cookies, was given away in a contest celebrating Nickelodeon's 20 years on television. In 2006, one of Nickelodeon's celebrities would take over Nickelodeon from Monday to Friday, sitting on the Big Orange Couch.

SNICK line-ups
The following are the shows aired during SNICK for the year listed. Although these are the standard shows aired, some days would see variation in the SNICK line-up.

Home video releases
In August 1993, Nickelodeon released two VHS video tapes meant to recreate the SNICK-watching experience by including episodes from all four of the original SNICK shows: Clarissa Explains It All, Roundhouse, The Ren & Stimpy Show, and Are You Afraid of the Dark?. The tapes also included episodes of the original The Adventures of Pete & Pete shorts in between each SNICK show. as well as SNICK bumpers featuring the Big Orange Couch. The videos were released through Sony Wonder and came in orange-colored cassette tapes.

Volume 1: Nick SNICKS Friendship
Clarissa Explains It All: Season 3 episode "Sam's Swan Song"
The Ren & Stimpy Show: Season 1 episode "The Littlest Giant"
Are You Afraid of the Dark: Season 1 episode "The Tale of the Lonely Ghost"
Roundhouse: Season 1 episode "New Kid In Town"
The Adventures of Pete & Pete shorts "Artie, the Strongest Man in the World," "X-Ray Man," and "Route 34"

Volume 2: Nick SNICKS The Family
Clarissa Explains It All: Season 1 episode "Cool Dad"
The Ren & Stimpy Show: Season 2 episode "Fake Dad"
Are You Afraid of the Dark: Season 1 episode "The Tale of the Hungry Hounds"
Roundhouse: Season 1 episode "You Can't Fire Your Family"
The Adventures of Pete & Pete shorts "The Burping Room," "Mom's Plate," and "The Punishment"

Notes

References

External links
Every SNICK Show Ever, Ranked
Inside Nickelodeon’s Saturday Night Gamble
How Well Do You Really Remember SNICK?
A Talk With Ralph Kelsey, the Man Who Wrote the Opening for SNICK

Nickelodeon programming blocks
Saturday mass media